Tarse may refer to:

a penis
a male falcon
the tarsus (skeleton)
Tarsus, Mersin
Tarse, a legendary eastern kingdom:
the homeland of the Three Magi
the homeland of the Tatars
eponymous kingdom of The King of Tars